Randøy Bridge is a suspension bridge in Hjelmeland municipality in Rogaland county, Norway. The bridge crosses the Ølesundet strait and links the island of Randøy to the mainland. The bridge opened in 1976 as part of County Road Fv650.

References

Suspension bridges in Norway
Bridges in Rogaland
Hjelmeland